The Andover National Bank building is a historic bank building at 23 Main Street in Andover, Massachusetts.  The brick Romanesque Revival building occupies a prominent place in Andover center, opposite the town hall.  It was designed by Hartwell and Richardson and built by the local firm of Hardy and Cole.  It was completed in 1890.  Its first tenants, in addition to the bank, were the Andover Savings Bank, local offices of the Merrimack Fire Insurance Company, and the local Masonic lodge.

The building was listed on the National Register of Historic Places in 1982.

See also
National Register of Historic Places listings in Andover, Massachusetts
National Register of Historic Places listings in Essex County, Massachusetts

References

Bank buildings on the National Register of Historic Places in Massachusetts
1890s architecture in the United States
Buildings and structures in Andover, Massachusetts
National Register of Historic Places in Andover, Massachusetts
Hartwell and Richardson buildings